Israeli couscous (singular: פְּתִית), is toasted pasta in tiny balls, developed in Israel in the 1950s when rice was scarce due to austerity in Israel. Despite its name in English, it is not a type of couscous (plural: כֻּסְכּוּסִים).

History 

Ptitim was created in 1953, during the austerity period in Israel.

Israel's first prime minister, David Ben-Gurion, asked Eugen Proper, one of the founders of the Osem food company, to devise a wheat-based substitute for rice. The company took up the challenge and developed ptitim, which is made of hard wheat flour and toasted in an oven. Ptitim was initially produced with a rice-shape, but after its success Osem also began to produce a ball-shaped variety inspired by couscous.

Consequently, ptitim is sometimes called "Ben-Gurion rice".

Preparation
Ptitim is made by extruding dough through a round mold, before it is cut and toasted, giving it the uniform natural-grain-like shape and its unique nutty flavor. Unlike common types of pasta and couscous, ptitim was factory-made from the outset, and therefore is rarely seen home-made from scratch. The store-bought product is easy and quick to prepare.

In Israel, ptitim is popular among children, who eat it plain, or mixed with fried onion and tomato paste. Ptitim is now produced in ring, star, and heart shapes for added appeal. Varieties made with whole wheat and spelt flour are also available for health-conscious consumers. Ptitim has also been popularised in the other countries, and in the United States, it can be found on the menus of contemporary American chefs and in gourmet markets.

Ptitim can be used in many different types of dishes, both hot and cold. The grains retain their shape and texture even when reheated, and they do not clump together. Commonly, ptitim is prepared with sautéed onions or garlic (vegetables, meat, chicken or sausage can also be added). The ptitim grains may be fried for a short time before adding water. They can also be baked, go in soup, served in a pie, used for stuffing, or made as a risotto. Ptitim may also be used in other dishes as a substitute for pasta or rice. American chef Charlie Trotter has produced a number of recipes for ptitim-based gourmet dishes, even as a dessert.

Similar products
Ptitim is very similar to the Ashkenazi Jewish farfel, which was brought to Israel by Ashkenazi Jews from Europe beginning in the 1800s, and the two are often substituted for each other.

Ptitim's round shape is reminiscent of the forms of Levantine 'pearl' couscous that pre-date it, and which are known as moghrabieh in Jordan, Lebanon and Syria, or as maftoul in Palestinian cuisine. While the Levantine dish is a coated couscous, ptitim is an extruded paste, and the two are very different in terms of taste and preparation.

Ptitim is also similar to the Berber berkoukes (aka abazine) and the Sardinian fregula, but these, too, unlike ptitim, are rolled and coated products. Ptitim also resemble some products of the pastina family, in particular acini di pepe, orzo ("risoni") and stellini. However, unlike pastina, the ptitim grains are pre-baked/toasted to give them their chewy texture and nutty flavor.

See also

 Levantine cuisine
 Tarhonya

References

External links

How to Cook Israeli Couscous
Israeli Couscous Recipes 

Israeli cuisine
Types of pasta
Middle Eastern cuisine
Israeli inventions